Vashyam is a 1991 Indian Malayalam film, directed by Suresh Unnithan. The film stars Abhilasha and Harish Kumar in the lead roles. The film has musical score by A. T. Ummer.

Cast
Abhilasha
Harish Kumar

Soundtrack
The music was composed by A. T. Ummer and the lyrics were written by Poovachal Khader.

References

External links
 

1991 films
1990s Malayalam-language films